Dem Boyz may refer to:

 "Dem Boyz" (Boyz n da Hood song)
 "Dem Boyz" (Lil' Mo song)

See also
 "We Dem Boyz", Wiz Khalifa song